The bigha (also formerly beegah) is a traditional unit of measurement of area of a land, commonly used in northern India (including Uttarakhand, Haryana, Himachal Pradesh, Punjab, Madhya Pradesh, Uttar Pradesh, Bihar, Jharkhand, West Bengal, Assam, Gujarat and Rajasthan), Bangladesh and Nepal. There is no "standard" size of bigha. The size of a bigha varies considerably from place to place.

Its sub-unit is Biswa (or Bisa) or Katha (or Katta) in many regions. Again there is no "standard" size of biswa or katha. A bigha may have 5 to 200 biswa in different regions.

Uses in India 
The bigha is a traditional unit of land in several parts of North India. Sale and purchase of land (particularly agricultural land) is still done unofficially in this unit. However, the area is recorded in hectare or square metres in official land records. Bigha varies in size from one part of India to another. Various states and often regions within the same state have different sizes attributed to the bigha. It is usually less than one standard acre (43,560 square feet or 4,047 square metre) but can extend up to 3 acres (1.2 hectare).

Each katha consists of 20 Lessa with a Lessa covering  in area.
 In Bihar, different regions have different sizes of bigha. One katha is further subdivided in 20 dhur.
 1 decimal in Bihar equals to 435.56 sq feet. 1 decimal is equal to 1/100 acre.
 In some of eastern parts of the Bihar including Munger, Bhagalpur and Jamui, one dhur is further subdivided into one square lagga (pole length). One lagga is equivalent to 5.5 hand lengths, with each hand length being . Therefore, one lagga is 99 inches, or 251.46 cm.
 In Himachal Pradesh, five bigha is equal to one acre (0.0809 hectare).
 In Punjab and Haryana, 2 bigha is equal to one acre, each bigha is 4 kanaals,  each kanaal is 20 marlas, each marla is 9 square karam, each square karam is 30.25 sq ft (5.5 X 5.5 ft), each karam is 5.5 feet. See measurement of land in Punjab.
 In central India, bighas were standardized at 3025 yd2(2529.3 m2) or 5/8 acre (0.2529 hectare).
 In Madhya Pradesh, one Katha = .
 In Uttar Pradesh, one bigha can mean different things to people in different districts of the state. In the remainder of Uttar Pradesh, 1 bigha is divided into 20 biswas. Each biswa is 125 m2 or 154.32 yd2 (hence one Bigha is 0.25 Hectare (or 2500 m2 or 3086.4 yd2 or 26909 ft2). 6 Biswa ≈1 Bigha (Kaccha)
 In Uttar Pradesh East one Bigha equals to 20 Biswa(Pakka) and 10 Biswa(kaccha). This is not use as official but on local scale in field calculation.
 In Uttar Pradesh (West) the measurements are slightly different: one Bigha=20 20 biswa=60 Decimal=2428.80 m2
 In Uttarakhand, 1 Bigha is subdivided into 20 Bissas or 12 Nali. or 632.2981 m2.
 In West Bengal, the Bigha was standardized under British colonial rule at 1600 yd2 (0.1338 hectare or 0.3306 acre); this is often interpreted as being 1/3 acre (it is precisely 40⁄121 acre). In metric units, a bigha is hence 1333 m2.
However, in Maharashtra and Tamil Nadu, Bigha is not in practical measurement unit.

Uses in Bangladesh 
Bigha is a traditional unit of land in entire Bangladesh, with land purchases still being undertaken in this unit. One bigha is equal to 1,600 square yard as standardized in pre-partition Bengal during the British rule. In other words, 3 bigha are just 0.5 katha/360 sq ft short of 1 acre.

Measurements of area in terms of bigha
1 Katha (কাঠা) = 720 sq ft (80 sq yd or 66.89 sq m)
1 Bigha (বিঘা) = 20 katha (কাঠা) (14,400 sq ft or 1,337.8 sq m)
1 Acre (একর) = 3 bigha (বিঘা) 60.5 katha (কাঠা) (4,840 sq yd or 43,560 sq ft or 4,047 sq m)

Use in Nepal 
A Bigha is a customary unit of measurement in Nepal, equal to about 6,773 square meters. Officially, most measurement of lands use units of either Bigha (in Terai region) or Ropani (Nepali: रोपनी) (in Hilly regions). Metric system (SI unit of square metre) is very seldom used officially in measuring area of land.

Measurement of area in terms of bigha
1 Bigha (बिघा)= 20 Kattha (कठ्ठा) (about 6,772.63 m² or 72900 sq.ft.)
1 Kattha (कठ्ठा) = 20 Dhur (धुर) (about 338.63 m² or 3,645 sq.ft.)
1 Dhur (धुर) = 16.93 m² or 182.25 sq.ft.
1 Kanwa (कनवा) = 1/16 Dhur (धुर)
1 Kanaee (कनई) = 1/16 Kanwa (कनवा) [Kanwa is largely obsolete and is used only when tiny lands are very precious]
 
1 Bigha = 13.31 Ropani (रोपनी)
1 Ropani = 16 aana (आना) (about 508.72 m² or 5476 sq. ft.)
1 aana = 4 paisa (पैसा) (about 31.80 m² or 342.25 sq.ft.)
1 paisa = 4 daam (दाम) (7.95 m²)
1 Bigha = 6,772.63 m2

For the different Ropani system from the one above
1 Bigha = .677263 hectare = 1.6735 acre = 13.31 Ropani
1 Hectare = 19.6565 Ropani
19.6565 Ropani = 1 Hectare
1 Ropani = 508.83771 m²

Use in Fiji 
In Fiji Hindi 1 bigha is equal to 1 acre

In popular culture
The classic Hindi movie Do Bigha Zamin by Bimal Roy in year 1953 portrayed the struggle of a poor peasant with very little landholding.

See also
 Doab
 Jagir
 Khadir and Bangar
 Barani, Nahri, Chahi, Taal
 Banjar, Jungle, Abadi, Shamlat, Gair Mumkin
 Measurement of land in Punjab
 Patwari
 Zaildar
 Zamindar

References

Sources 
 Area conversion, royalreality.com (archived 27 April 2006)
 Land glossary, Bhulekh – etawah.nic.in (archived 29 June 2011)
 Land measurement in India, landzone.in
 Bhulekh, uk.gov.in

External links 
 Bigha at Sizes.com

Units of area
Customary units in India